Hartley is a census-designated place (CDP) in Hartley County, Texas, United States. The population was 540 at the 2010 census.

History

In 1832, John Charles Beales and Jose Manuel Royella were granted the section where Hartley is now located under colonization laws of Mexico and Texas. They represented the Arkansas and Texas Land Company; however, they failed to colonize this territory and they forfeited their rights.

In 1875, the Texas Legislature passed an act which allowed contractors to clear one mile of the river Sabine, Angeline, and Neches, and the Pine Island Bayou in exchange for land grants. The contractors were required to survey the land, return field notes to the Land Commissioner and request him to number the sections. The contractors then received a deed to the uneven numbered sections with the State retaining the even-numbered ones as school lands. The field notes of Beaty, Seale, and Forwood were filed November 17, 1875. The only other deeds registered in the county prior to 1884 were those of the Fort Worth and Denver Railroad, Brooks and Burleson, Gunter and Burleson and W.M. Lee. On July 1, 1888, Beaty, Seale, and Forwood sold Section 23 to James A. Hudson of Logan County, Illinois and John A. Lutz of New York for $10,000.00. They sold the right of way to the Fort Worth and Denver Railroad July 1, 1888.

Many changes occurred in a very short time. Handbills were distributed throughout the eastern and southern states by the owners who were anxious to turn Hartley into a booming metropolis. Section 23 was plotted into lots and registered with the Land Commissioner of Texas. A tent city came into being and grew rapidly as people came with high expectations and determination to make for themselves a new life in a new land.

Geography
Hartley is located at  (35.884358, -102.398395).

Demographics

2020 census

As of the 2020 United States census, there were 382 people, 217 households, and 182 families residing in the CDP.

2000 census
As of the census of 2000, there were 441 people, 149 households, and 118 families residing in the CDP. The population density was 63.2 people per square mile (24.4/km2). There were 157 housing units at an average density of 22.5/sq mi (8.7/km2). The racial makeup of the CDP was 92.29% White, 0.45% African American, 0.91% Native American, 0.23% Asian, 4.31% from other races, and 1.81% from two or more races. Hispanic or Latino of any race were 11.11% of the population.

There were 149 households, out of which 45.0% had children under the age of 18 living with them, 69.8% were married couples living together, 3.4% had a female householder with no husband present, and 20.8% were non-families. 17.4% of all households were made up of individuals, and 10.1% had someone living alone who was 65 years of age or older. The average household size was 2.96 and the average family size was 3.31.

In the CDP, the population was spread out, with 34.7% under the age of 18, 8.4% from 18 to 24, 29.9% from 25 to 44, 18.1% from 45 to 64, and 8.8% who were 65 years of age or older. The median age was 30 years. For every 100 females, there were 104.2 males. For every 100 females age 18 and over, there were 97.3 males.

The median income for a household in the CDP was $38,500, and the median income for a family was $45,000. Males had a median income of $25,469 versus $18,750 for females. The per capita income for the CDP was $16,150. About 10.2% of families and 10.0% of the population were below the poverty line, including 10.5% of those under age 18 and 11.1% of those age 65 or over.

Education
Hartley is served by the Hartley Independent School District.

Climate
According to the Köppen Climate Classification system, Hartley has a semi-arid climate, abbreviated "BSk" on climate maps.

References

Census-designated places in Hartley County, Texas
Census-designated places in Texas